This is a list of the French SNEP Top 100 CD Singles, Top 50 Digital Singles, Top 200 CD Albums & Top 50 Digital Albums number ones of 2010.

Number-ones by week

Singles chart

Albums chart

Top best-selling singles and albums in 2010
This is the 20 best-selling of singles, and albums in 2010.

Singles (Physical + Digital)

Albums (Physical + Digital)

See also
2010 in music
List of number-one hits (France)
List of Top 100 singles of 2010 (France)
List of artists who reached number one on the French Singles Chart

References

Number-one hits
France
2010